was a village located in Hiki District, Saitama Prefecture, Japan.

As of 2003, the village had an estimated population of 5,568 and a density of 387.20 persons per km2. The total area was 14.38 km2.

On February 1, 2006, Tamagawa, along with the former village of Tokigawa (also from Hiki District), was merged to create the new town of Tokigawa.

Dissolved municipalities of Saitama Prefecture
Hiki District, Saitama